The Desperados is a 1969 American Western film directed by Henry Levin and starring Vince Edwards and Jack Palance.

Plot
A ruthless preacher, Parson Josiah Galt, leads a band of Southern marauders during the Civil War that includes his sons, David, Adam and Jacob. The parson has turned vengeful and sadistic since the death of his wife.

David can no longer stomach what his family is doing. When his brother Adam tries to rape a girl in a Kansas town that the Galts have just raided and looted, David tries to leave. He is brought back, accused of "treason" by his own father and sentenced to hang.

Managing to escape, David returns to his wife Laura and son Pauly and relocates in Texas under a false name. They live peacefully there for six years and the war ends.

The robberies and killings by the Galts continue, however, and one day they turn up in the Texas town. A conscience-stricken David feels compelled to tell Sheriff Kirkpatrick who they are and who he really is. Then, in a confrontation, David kills his brother Adam.

Parson Galt and son Jacob exact revenge by taking Laura and Pauly captive and then kill David's wife. To get his son back, David learns of a train robbery his father has planned. He foils it and kills his brother Jacob. In a final showdown, Josiah and David fight and both fall to their death.

Cast
 Vince Edwards as David Galt/Gant
 Sylvia Syms as Laura Gant
 Benjamin Edney as Pauly Gant
 Jack Palance as Parson Josiah Galt
 Sheila Burrell as Emily Galt
 George Maharis as Jacob Galt
 Kate O'Mara as Adah (Jacob's girl) 
 Christian Roberts as Adam Galt
 Kenneth Cope as Carlin
 Patrick Holt as Haller
 Christopher Malcolm as Gregg
 John Clark as Todd
 Neville Brand as Marshal Kilpatrick
 John Paul as Sheriff Lacey
 David Thomson as Deputy Tate
 Elliott Sullivan as Jennison

See also
 List of American films of 1969

External links
 

1969 films
1960s English-language films
1969 Western (genre) films
Films directed by Henry Levin
American Western (genre) films
American Civil War films
Films shot in Almería
Columbia Pictures films
Revisionist Western (genre) films
1960s American films